Bo Åke Skoglund, best known as Bosse Skoglund, (10 April 1936 – 10 April 2021) was a Swedish musician, drummer and percussionist. Skoglund appeared as a musician in the songs  Varm korv boogie, Tunna skivor and Klas-Göran.

References

External links
 
 

1936 births
2021 deaths
Swedish drummers